Frederick Beasley Ogden (July 20, 1827 - November 1, 1893) was an American attorney, jurist, and politician who served as the eighth Mayor of Hoboken, New Jersey from 1865 to 1867.

Biography
He was born on July 20, 1827, in Paterson, New Jersey. He was the son of New Jersey Supreme Court Justice Elias B. D. Ogden. He was the grandson of United States Senator and New Jersey Governor Aaron Ogden.

Ogden graduated from Princeton University in 1847 and was admitted to the bar in New Jersey in 1850.

He opened his office in Hoboken, New Jersey in December 1853. On July 4, 1865, he joined the Society of the Cincinnati. Her married Jane Millen Ford.

He served as the eighth Mayor of Hoboken, New Jersey from 1865 to 1867 when he replaced Charles T. Perry. He was succeeded by Frederick W. Bohnstedt. He then served as a judge in the District Court for Hoboken.

He died on November 1, 1893, from an "attack of paralysis".

References

1827 births
1893 deaths
Mayors of Hoboken, New Jersey
New Jersey lawyers
Princeton University alumni
19th-century American politicians
19th-century American lawyers